Peregrin Sandford (March 23, 1796 - November 15, 1884) was the Mayor of Paterson, New Jersey from 1857 to 1858.

Biography
He was born March 23, 1796, near Bloomingdale, New Jersey. He was the Mayor of Paterson, New Jersey from 1857 to 1858. He died on November 15, 1884. He was buried at  Cedar Lawn Cemetery in Paterson, New Jersey.

References

1796 births
1884 deaths
Mayors of Paterson, New Jersey
People from Bloomingdale, New Jersey
19th-century American politicians